Paul Virilio (4 January 1932 – 10 September 2018) was a French cultural theorist, urbanist, architect and aesthetic philosopher. He is best known for his writings about technology as it has developed in relation to speed and power, with diverse references to architecture, the arts, the city and the military. Virilio was a prolific creator of neologisms, most notably his concept of "Dromology", the all-around, pervasive inscription of speed in every aspect of life.

According to two biographers, Virilio was a "historian of warfare, technology and photography, a philosopher of architecture, military strategy and cinema, and a politically engaged provocative commentator on history, terrorism, mass media and human-machine relations."

Biography
Paul Virilio was born in Paris in 1932 to an Italian communist father and a Catholic Breton mother. He grew up in the northern coastal French region of Brittany. The Second World War made a big impression on him as the city of Nantes fell victim to the German blitzkrieg, became a port for the German navy, and was bombarded by British and American planes. The "war was his university". After training at the École des métiers d'art, Virilio specialised in stained-glass artwork and worked alongside Henri Matisse in churches in Paris. In 1950, he converted to Christianity.

After being conscripted into the army during the Algerian War, Virilio attended lectures in phenomenology by Maurice Merleau-Ponty at the Sorbonne.

In 1958, Virilio conducted a phenomenological inquiry into military space and the organization of territory, particularly concerning the Atlantic Wall, the 15,000 Nazi bunkers built during the Second World War along the French coastline that were designed to repel any Allied assault. In 1963, he began to collaborate with the architect Claude Parent and formed the Architecture Principe group (among the small group of interns were the architects Francois Seigneur and Jean Nouvel). After participating in the May 1968 uprising in Paris, Virilio was nominated Professor by the students at the École Spéciale d'Architecture. In 1973, he became the director of studies. The same year, Virilio became director of the magazine L'Espace Critique.

In 1975, he was one of the organizers of the Bunker Archéologie exhibition at the Musée des Arts Décoratifs, Paris, which was a collection of texts and images relating to the Atlantic Wall. He has since been widely published, translated, and anthologised.

In 1998, Virilio began to teach intensive seminars at the European Graduate School. His final projects involved working with homeless groups in Paris and building the first Museum of the Accident.

Ideas

The war model
Virilio developed what he called the "war model" of the modern city and of human society in general and is the inventor of the term 'dromology', meaning the logic of speed that is the foundation of technological society. His major works include War and Cinema, Speed and Politics and The Information Bomb in which he argues, among many other things, that military projects and technologies drive history. Like some other cultural theorists, he rejects labels - including 'cultural theorist' - yet he has been linked by others with post-structuralism and postmodernism. Some people describe Virilio's work as being positioned in the realm of the 'hypermodern'.  He has repeatedly affirmed his links with phenomenology, for example, and offers humanist critiques of modernist art movements such as Futurism. Throughout his books the political and theological themes of anarchism, pacifism and Catholicism reappear as central influences to his self-proclaimed 'marginal' approach to the question of technology.  His work has been compared to that of Marshall McLuhan, Jean Baudrillard, Gilles Deleuze and Félix Guattari, Jean-François Lyotard, Jacques Ellul,  and others. Virilio was also an urbanist. After having been a longtime resident of the city of Paris, he moved to La Rochelle.

Virilio's predictions about 'logistics of perception' - the use of images and information in war - (in War and Cinema, 1989) were so accurate that during the Gulf War he was invited to discuss his ideas with French military officers. Virilio argued that it was a 'world war in miniature'.

War and Cinema (1989)

War and Cinema: The Logistics of Perception, a 1989 book by Paul Virilio, discusses the relationship between image and war technology. Drawing on a number of films and film directors, including Sergei Eisenstein, Francis Ford Coppola, D.W. Griffith, and Stanley Kubrick, Virilio presents an postmodern analysis of how the representational methods of photography and cinema have impacted modern and historical warfare.

The integral accident

Virilio believed that technology cannot exist without the potential for accidents. For example, Virilio argued that the invention of the locomotive also contained the invention of derailment. He saw the Accident as a rather negative growth of social positivism and scientific progress. He believed the growth of technology, namely television, separates us directly from the events of real space and real time. In it he suggested we lose wisdom and sight of our immediate horizon and resort to the indirect horizon of our dissimulated environment. From this angle, the Accident can be mentally pictured as a sort of "fractal meteorite" whose impact is prepared in the propitious darkness, a landscape of events concealing future collisions. Aristotle claimed that "there is no science of the accident", but Virilio disagreed, pointing to the growing credibility of simulators designed to escape the accident— which he argued is an industry that is born from the unholy marriage of post-WW2 science and the military-industrial complex.
The first deterrence, nuclear deterrence, is presently being superseded by the second deterrence: a type of deterrence based on what I call 'the information bomb' associated with the new weaponry of information and communications technologies. Thus, in the very near future, and I stress this important point, it will no longer be war that is the continuation of politics by other means, it will be what I have dubbed 'the integral accident' that is the continuation of politics by other means.

Dromology

Virilio coined the term "dromology" (based on Dromos, an Ancient Greek noun for race or racetrack) to signify the "logic and impact of speed". Dromology is important when considering the structuring of society in relation to warfare and modern media, as the speed at which something happens may change its essential nature, and that which moves with speed quickly comes to dominate that which is slower. Hence the study of dromology "necessarily implies the study of the organisation of territory[, as whoever] controls the territory possesses it. Possession of territory is not primarily about laws and contracts, but first and foremost a matter of movement and circulation".

Logistics of perception

In contemporary warfare, logistics does not just imply the movement of personnel, tanks, fuel and so on, but also the movement of images both to and from the battlefield. Virilio talked a lot about the creation of CNN and the concept of the newshound. The newshound will capture images which will then be sent to CNN, which may then be broadcast to the public. This movement of images can start a conflict (Virilio uses the example of the events following the broadcasting of the Rodney King footage). The logistics of perception relates also to the televising of military maneuvers and the images of conflict that are watched not only by people at home, but also by the military personnel involved in the conflict. The 'field of battle' also exists as a 'field of perception'.

War of movement

For Virilio, the transition from feudalism to capitalism was driven not primarily by the politics of wealth and production techniques but by the mechanics of war. Virilio argued that the traditional feudal fortified city disappeared because of the increasing sophistication of weapons and possibilities for warfare. For Virilio, the concept of siege warfare became rather a war of movement. In Speed and Politics, he argues that 'history progresses at the speed of its weapons systems'.

The Administration of Fear

In an interview conducted by Bertrand Richard, Virilio articulated his concept of an administration of fear which governs contemporary life, together with a summary of his other philosophical views.  The interview was later printed as a short book (2010) and translated into English (2012).  Virilio chose the phrase in reference to the title of Graham Greene's novel  The Ministry of Fear, a fictional account of the Blitz in London; Virilio himself had lived through the Blitzkrieg in France as a boy, a formative event which informed his philosophy.

Based upon his experience as an urbanist, Virilio stresses that fear has not only a psychological aspect, but also a physical one which is closely related to speed.  To underline the point, he cites Hannah Arendt's claim in The Origins of Totalitarianism that "Terror is the realization of the law of movement", explaining that Arendt's use of the term "law of movement" refers to "the fact that there is no relationship to terror without a relationship
to life and speed. Terror cuts to the quick: it is connected to life and quickness through technology". One can see this, he notes, in the image of a gazelle running to escape a lion. For contemporary humanity, fear is also related to speed, which can be seen in scenarios such as a nuclear apocalypse or a stock market crash.  Hypotheticals like these are governed by computers, which act at speeds that are not tractable for humans.  Virilio also contends that perpetual, instantaneous communication via computers and the internet are disruptive to biological rhythms and historical seasonal patterns of life in human culture, producing both fear and misery.  As an example, he cites an increase of suicides which occurred among France Télécom employees from 2009 to 2010.  Virilio attributed the suicides to the organization's restructuring which required frequent relocation of employees and expectations of constant communication.

Reception
Jean Baudrillard, while drawing on Virilio's works in 1985, eventually stated in 1988 that Virilio's analyses were out of date as "Speed is out!", stating that immobility has set in because "all trips have already taken place".

A book-length criticism of Virilio's work to 2004 was written by Steve Redhead. He observed:
His scattergun writing style is not always easy to follow, often provoking disorientation and dislocation at the very least. Insights, personal memories, detailed histories, major theoretical leaps and banalities sit side by side.
He also notes that Virilio does not pass the grade in academic studies:
Reading Virilio thoroughly does leave the reader with the feeling of many dislocated, undeveloped ideas swirling around often at the level of great generality. The content is often not particularly logical if viewed from a conventional academic perspective in the human or social sciences.
However, for Law and Popular Culture, Redhead concedes Virilio as a factor:
Paul Virilio's writing have long had a major role in the theoretical socio-legal studies subdiscipline of law and popular culture which has operated at the intersection of critical legal studies and cultural studies for over two decades.

In 2014, Mark Lacy, an analyst of security, technology and global politics noted:
Virilio is unlikely to be read in the 'mainstream' of academia (although one might find his works on the reading lists of a military academy).
Lacy credits Virilio with balancing the propaganda of progress against the management of fear at some cost:
Virilio draws on and develops points that are made by many critical thinkers from (predominantly) the twentieth century (most notably Walter Benjamin), assembling ideas in new contexts, creating a vision of the world through concepts and language that is often unsettling, a (re)description that makes the world feel strange and unfamiliar. Virilio's often alien-sounding concepts attempt to enable us to see the world anew, to view a world that is presented to us in terms of fear and progress as something alien (and alienating), to give a form to feelings and suspicions that remain vague, unclear, uncertain, out of place.

Sokal and Bricmont
Virilio was one of the many cultural theorists (and other postmodernists) criticized by physicists Alan Sokal and Jean Bricmont in 1997 for what they characterize as misunderstanding and misuse of science and mathematics. Virilio's works are the subject of chapter 10 of Fashionable Nonsense. Their criticism consists of a series of quotes (often long) from Virilio's works, and then explanations of how Virilio confuses basic physics concepts and abuses scientific terminology, to the point of absurdity. In the authors' words:

The writings of Paul Virilio revolve principally around the themes of technology, communication, and speed. They contain a plethora of references to physics, particularly the theory of relativity. Though Virilio's sentences are slightly more meaningful than those of Deleuze-Guattari, what is presented as "science" is a mixture of monumental confusions and wild fantasies. Furthermore, his analogies between physics and social questions are the most arbitrary imaginable, when he does not simply become intoxicated with his own words. We confess our sympathy with many of Virilio's political and social views; but the cause is not, alas, helped by his pseudo-physics.

A criticism of a passage often reads something like this:
Here Virilio mixes up velocity (vitesse) and acceleration, the two basic concepts of kinematics (the description of motion), which are introduced and carefully distinguished at the beginning of every introductory physics course.[221] Perhaps this confusion isn't worth stressing; but for a purported specialist in the philosophy of speed, it is nonetheless a bit surprising.

They end their chapter with a long quote followed by this comment:
This paragraph — which in the French original is a single 193-word sentence, whose "poetry" is unfortunately not fully captured by the translation — is the most perfect example of diarrhea of the pen that we have ever encountered. And as far as we can see, it means precisely nothing.

Bibliography
Speed and Politics: An Essay on Dromology. New York: Semiotext(e), 1977 [1986]
War and Cinema: The Logistics of Perception. London: Verso, 1989.
Popular Defense and Ecological Struggles. New York: Semiotext(e), 1990.
The Aesthetics of Disappearance. New York: Semiotext(e), 1991.
Lost Dimension. New York: Semiotext(e), 1991.
Atom Egoyan. Paris: Dis Voir, 1994.
The Vision Machine. Bloomington: Indiana University Press, 1994.
Bunker Archaeology. New York: Princeton University Press, 1994.
The Art of the Motor. Minneapolis: University of Minnesota Press, 1995.
Open Sky. London: Verso, 1997.
Pure War. New York: Semiotext(e), 1997.
Politics of the Very Worst. New York: Semiotext(e), 1999.
Polar Inertia. London: Sage, 1999.
A Landscape of Events. Cambridge: MIT Press, 2000.
The Information Bomb. London: Verso, 2000.
Strategy of Deception. London: Verso, 2000.
Virilio Live: Selected Interviews. Edited by John Armitage.  London: Sage, 2001.
Ground Zero.  London: Verso, 2002.
Desert Screen: War at the Speed of Light. London: Continuum, 2002.
Crepuscular Dawn. New York: Semiotext(e), 2002.
Art and Fear. London: Continuum, 2003. ( originally published in 2000 by Editions Galilee under the title La Procedure Silence, meaning "The Silence Trial". )
Unknown Quantity. New York: Thames & Hudson, 2003.
City of Panic. Oxford: Berg, 2005.
The Accident of Art. (with Sylvère Lotringer) New York: Semiotext(e), 2005.
Negative Horizon: An Essay in Dromoscopy. London: Continuum, 2005.
Art as Far as the Eye Can See. Oxford: Berg Publishers, 2007.
The Original Accident. Cambridge: Polity, 2007
Grey Ecology. New York/Dresden: Atropos Press, 2009.
The University of Disaster. Cambridge: Polity, 2010.
The Futurism of the Instant: Stop-Eject. Cambridge: Polity, 2010.
A Winter's Journey : Four Conversations with Marianne Brausch. The French list. Seagull Books, 2011.
The Administration of Fear. New York: Semiotext(e), 2012.

Notes

References
 "Paul Virilio spricht mit Heinz-Norbert Jocks. Universität des Unglücks. Von Krieg, Raum und Zeit und vom Sterben am Meer in La Rochelle", Lettre International, Berlin, pages 24–31, 2018, ISSN 0945-5167
 Armitage, John, editor (2000) Paul Virilio: From Modernism to Hypermodernism and Beyond. London: Sage
 Derian, James Der, editor (1998) The Virilio Reader, Malden (Massachusetts): Blackwell Publishers
 James, Ian (2007) Paul Virilio, London: Routledge

External links

 Paul Virilio. Faculty page at European Graduate School. Biography, bibliography, photos and video lectures.
 Paul Virilio. 'Red Alert in Cyberspace' in Radical Philosophy. November/December 1995
 Paul Virilio and Louise Wilson. "Cyberwar, God and Television".  Interview. In: ctheory. December 1, 1994.
 Paul Virilio and Jérôme Sans. "Game Of Love & Chance". Discussion. In: virtually2k. 1995.
 Jason Adams. "Popular Defense in the Empire of Speed: Paul Virilio and the Phenomenology of the Political Body". MA Thesis, Simon Fraser University. 2002. 
 John Armitage. "Beyond Postmodernism? Paul Virilio's Hypermodern Cultural Theory". In: ctheory. November 15, 2000.
 Steinmann, Kate. Apparatus, Capture, Trace: Photography and Biopolitics in: Fillip. Fall 2011.
 Bocquet, Denis. Paul Virilio (1932-2018), Il Giornale dell'Architettura, September 2018 (in Italian)
 Paul Virilio spricht mit Heinz-Norbert Jocks. Universität des Unglücks. Von Krieg, Raum und Zeit und vom Sterben am Meer in La Rochelle. Lettre International, Berlin, p. 24–31, 2018, ISSN 0945-5167

Aphorists
Social philosophers
Christian anarchists
Christian humanists
Christian continental philosophers and theologians
Converts to Roman Catholicism from atheism or agnosticism
Catholic philosophers
Criticism of transhumanism
Philosophers of technology
Political philosophers
Phenomenologists
Postmodernists
Postmodern theory
Critical theorists
Urban theorists
Systems scientists
University of Paris alumni
Academic staff of European Graduate School
Futurologists
French film critics
1932 births
2018 deaths
Writers from Paris
20th-century French philosophers
French Roman Catholics
French people of Breton descent
French people of Italian descent
French technology writers
21st-century French philosophers
Philosophers of art
Philosophers of culture
Philosophers of history
Philosophers of war
Philosophers of science
French male writers
Mass media theorists
Media historians
Military historians
Military theorists
Historians of technology
Historians of warfare
Historians of weapons
War writers